Copata (also Vilaque Copata) is a small town in Bolivia. In 2009 it had an estimated population of 893.

References

  Instituto Nacional de Estadística 

Populated places in La Paz Department (Bolivia)